Lords of Madness is an official supplement for the 3.5 edition of the Dungeons & Dragons fantasy roleplaying game.

Contents
The book includes new content for aberrations including new aberration monsters and monsters related to them, and information on how to hunt aberrations. It is split into the following chapters:

 "What Is an Aberration?": Defines what characteristics make a creature an aberration, and how these creatures originated.  Also provides details on how to run a campaign based on aberrations.
 "The Deep Masters": Provides information on the aboleth, including their anatomy, variant creatures, a prestige class called the Savant, feats, and magic.
 "The Eye Tyrants": Provides information on the beholder, including their anatomy, variant creatures, a prestige class called the Beholder Mage, feats, and magic.
 "The Mind Flayers": Provides information on the illithid, including their anatomy, variant creatures, and magic.
 "The Slave Takers": Provides information on the neogi, including different types of neogi, their anatomy, and magic.
 "The Eaters": Provides information on the grell, including their anatomy, society, and magic.
 "The Wearers of Flesh": Provides information on the tsochar, including their anatomy, variant creatures, society, and magic.
 "New Monsters": Provides statistics and information on the beholderkin, cildabrin, shadowcloak elder cloaker, elder brain, elder eidolon, gas spore, gibbering mouther, half-farspawn, hound of the gloom, illithidae, mind flayer variants, pseudonatural creature template, psurlon, shaboath, shadow creature template, silthilar, urophion, and zeugalak.
 "The Aberration Hunter": Provides information for characters that hunt aberrations, including new feats, magic, spells, and magic items, and the new prestige classes Abolisher, Darkrunner, Fleshwarper, Keeper of the Cerulean Sign, Sanctified Mind, and Topaz Guardian.

Publication history
Lords of Madness was written by Rich Baker, James Jacobs, and Steve Winter, and was published in May 2005. Wayne England and Ed Cox drew the cover art, and the interior art was by Steve Belledin, Mitch Cotie, Ed Cox, Dennis Crabapple McClain, Steve Ellis, Wayne England, Colin Fix, Dana Knutson, Doug Kovacs, Chuck Lukacs, Jim Nelson, Michael Phillippi, Wayne Reynolds, Richard Sardinha, Dan Scott, and Ron Spencer.

This book is part of a series of books regarding specific monster types, which includes the Draconomicon and Libris Mortis.

Rich Baker explains how the book's designers chose the creatures with which they worked: "The best master aberrations we identified were the aboleths, beholders, and mind flayers. They're highly intelligent, they enslave other monsters, and they're particularly inimical to human life and society. Beyond those three major races, we found a couple of others that shared some similar characteristics but were not as iconic to the game -- the neogi and the grell. Finally, we created a new aberration just for this book, the tsochari. As the lead designer, I divvied up the book into assignments for Steve and James. Steve got mind flayers and neogi, James got beholders and aboleths. I took the grell and the new race, the tsochari. A fair amount of that decision-making was driven by the physics of carving up a book for three designers to work on, but I did decide to hog the new race for myself. I wanted to take a shot at 'em."

Reception

Reviews

References

External links
http://www.rpg.net/reviews/archive/11/11917.phtml

Dungeons & Dragons sourcebooks
Role-playing game supplements introduced in 2005